The Chinle Formation is an Upper Triassic continental geologic formation in the western United States which has yielded fossils of  many archosaurs: a group of vertebrates that includes crocodiles, pterosaurs, dinosaurs (including birds), and other extinct relatives. This is a list of all archosaurs from the formation, including suchians (crocodilian relatives) and avemetatarsalians (dinosaurs, pterosaurs, and their relatives), as well as the abundant crocodilian-like phytosaurs, which may either be true archosaurs or very close relatives of Archosauria.

Phytosaurs

Suchians

Aetosaurs

Crocodylomorphs

Other paracrocodylomorphs

Other suchians

Avemetatarsalians

Basal avemetatarsalians

Dinosaurs

Sauropodomorphs 
Prosauropod tracks are present in the Redonda, Sloan Canyon, and Sheep Pen Sandstone formations. Possibly the Rock Point Formation as well. Geographically, the tracks are present in New Mexico.

Theropods and near-relatives 
Theropod tracks have been found in Utah and New Mexico recovered from the Redonda, Sloan Canyon, and Sheep Pen Sandstone formations. Indeterminate theropod remains are stratigraphically present in the Petrified Forest, Bluewater Creek, and Rock Point members of New Mexico.

See also
 Paleobiota of the Chinle Formation

Footnotes

References
 Ezcurra, M.D. (2006). "A review of the systematic position of the dinosauriform archosaur Eucoelophysis baldwini Sullivan & Lucas, 1999 from the Upper Triassic of New Mexico, USA." Geodiversitas, 28(4):649-684.
 Irmis, R. B. 2005. The vertebrate fauna of the Upper Triassic Chinle Formation in northern Arizona. p. 63-88. in S.J. Nesbitt, W.G. Parker, and R.B. Irmis (eds.) 2005. Guidebook to the Triassic formations of the Colorado Plateau in northern Arizona: Geology, Paleontology, and History. Mesa Southwest Museum Bulletin 9.
 Nesbitt, S.J., Irmis, R.B., and Parker, W.G. (2005). "A critical review of the Triassic North American dinosaur record." In Kellner, A.W.A., Henriques, D.D.R., & Rodrigues, T. (eds.), II Congresso Latino-Americano de Paleontologia de Vertebrados, Boletim de Resumos. Rio de Janeiro: Museum Nacional/UFRJ, 139.
 Sues, H.-D., Nesbitt, S. J., Berman, D. S., and A. C., Henrici. 2011. A late-surviving basal theropod dinosaur from the latest Triassic of North America. Proceedings of the Royal Society B. 
 Weishampel, David B.; Dodson, Peter; and Osmólska, Halszka (eds.): The Dinosauria, 2nd, Berkeley: University of California Press. 861 pp. .

Dinosaur-related lists
 
 
List